Minka (民家 literally "peasant house") is a type of Japanese house.

Minka can refer to:

Custom
 Minka (communal work) or mink'a, a form of communal work first used during the Inca Empire
 Minka Bird, a native Australian mythological creature

People
Female
Minka, a character in the opera Le roi malgré lui
 Minka Govekar (1874–1950), Slovene teacher and campaigner for women's rights
 Minka Pradelski (born 1947) German sociologist 
 Minka Kelly, American actress
Male
 Minka Yady Camara, Guinean footballer
Surname
 Henri Pierre Armand Nnouck Minka, Cameroonian footballer

Music
"Ikhav Kozak za Dunaj", Ukrainian folk tune, known in German as "Schöne Minka"

Film
Minka (film) 1995 short film by Guinean director Mohamed Camara

Disambiguation pages with given-name-holder lists
Unisex given names
Disambiguation pages with surname-holder lists